I Am Half-Sick of Shadows, Said the Lady of Shalott is a painting by John William Waterhouse completed in 1915.  It is the third painting by Waterhouse that depicts a scene from the Tennyson poem, "The Lady of Shalott".  The title of the painting is a quotation from the last two lines in the fourth and final verse of the second part of Tennyson's poem:

This painting depicts an earlier point in the tale of the Lady of Shalott than those depicted by Waterhouse in his previous two works of 1888 and 1894; the Lady is still confined in her tower, weaving a tapestry, viewing the world outside only through the reflection in the large mirror in the background.  In the painting, the mirror reveals a bridge over a river leading to the walls and towers of Camelot; also visible nearby are a man and a woman, perhaps the "two young lovers lately wed" referred to in Tennyson's poem.  The scene is set shortly before an image of Lancelot appears in the mirror, enticing the Lady out of her tower to her death.

The painting shows the Lady of Shalott resting from her weaving.

The lady wears a red dress, in a room with Romanesque columns holding up the arches of the window reflected in the mirror.  The frame of the loom and the geometric tiles of the floor lead the viewer into the room, where reds, yellows and blues echo the more vivid colours outside. A single poppy can be seen reflected in the mirror. The shuttles of the loom resemble boats, foreshadowing the Lady's death.

The painting was exhibited at the Royal Academy Summer Exhibition in 1916.  It was sold from the estate of the accountant John George Griffiths CVO at Hampton's in 1923 for 300 guineas, and passed through the hands of the art dealer Arthur de Casseres.  It was owned by Mr and Mrs Frederick Cowan, and inherited by their great-niece, the wife of Canadian engineer Philip Berney Jackson, who donated to the Art Gallery of Ontario in 1971.

References

External links
 'I am half sick of shadows,' said The Lady of Shalott (Alfred, Lord Tennyson, The Lady of Shalott, Part II), Art Gallery of Ontario
 John William Waterhouse. ‘I am half sick of shadows,’ said the Lady of Shalott, Art Gallery of Ontario
 J.W. Waterhouse and the Magic of Color, Dani Cavallaro, p.52-53
 I Am Half-Sick of Shadows," Said the Lady of Shalott, victorianweb.org

1915 paintings
Arthurian paintings
Paintings by John William Waterhouse
Collections of the Art Gallery of Ontario
Women in art
Bridges in art
Paintings based on works by Alfred, Lord Tennyson
Mirrors in art